The 1959–60 NYU Violets men's basketball team represented New York University in intercollegiate basketball during the 1959–60 season. The team finished the season with a 22–5 overall record while winning the Metropolitan New York Conference with a perfect 4–0 record in league play. The Violets earned their second NCAA Division I basketball tournament Final Four appearance (their first was in 1944–45). They were led by second-year head coach Lou Rossini.

Roster
Source

References

NYU Violets men's basketball seasons
Nyu
Nyu
NCAA Division I men's basketball tournament Final Four seasons
1959 in sports in New York City
1960 in sports in New York City